Hoeroa Tiopira (10 January 1871 – 1 October 1930) was a New Zealand rugby union player who represented his country on the 1893 tour of Australia. He did not appear in any test matches as New Zealand did not play their first test until 1903.

Biography
Born on 10 January 1871 in the community of Omahu, on the outskirts of Hastings, Tiopira was educated at Meeanee School and Te Aute College.

His provincial career lasted until 1895.

Tiopira was selected for the New Zealand team for their tour of Australia in 1893, becoming the first player from the Hawke's Bay union to gain national honours.  On that tour he played in eight matches, with a leg injury preventing him from playing more. He was commended for his leadership in contesting the ruck.

Tiopira later farmed at Waimana in the Bay of Plenty, and died at Taihape on 1 October 1930.

References 

1871 births
1930 deaths
Rugby union players from the Hawke's Bay Region
People educated at Te Aute College
New Zealand rugby union players
New Zealand international rugby union players
New Zealand Māori rugby union players
Hawke's Bay rugby union players
Rugby union forwards